Mingus Mingus Mingus Mingus Mingus is a studio album by the American jazz composer and bassist Charles Mingus which was released on January 9, 1964.

Background
Mingus collaborated with arranger/orchestrator Bob Hammer to score the music for a large ensemble of brass and saxophones.

Most of the compositions on this album had been previously recorded or have since been rerecorded, some under different titles, on other albums:

 "II B.S." as "Haitian Fight Song" on Plus Max Roach and The Clown
 "I X Love" as "Duke's Choice" on A Modern Jazz Symposium of Music and Poetry.
 "Mood Indigo" (Barney Bigard, Duke Ellington) on Mingus Dynasty
 "Celia" on East Coasting
 "Better Get Hit in Yo' Soul" as "Better Git It in Your Soul" on Mingus Ah Um (also "Better Git Hit in Your Soul" on Mingus at Antibes)
 "Theme for Lester Young" as "Goodbye Pork Pie Hat" on Mingus Ah Um
 "Hora Decubitus" as "E's Flat, Ah's Flat Too" on Blues & Roots
 "Freedom" on The Complete Town Hall Concert (1962)

Track listing 
Adapted from 1995 CD reissue; many original LP copies have incorrect durations listed. All tracks composed by Charles Mingus, except where noted.

Personnel 
Tracks #1 and 4–8, recorded on September 20, 1963:

 Eddie Preston – trumpet
 Richard Williams – trumpet
 Britt Woodman – trombone
 Don Butterfield – tuba
 Jerome Richardson – soprano and baritone saxophone, flute
 Dick Hafer – tenor saxophone, clarinet, flute
 Booker Ervin – tenor saxophone
 Eric Dolphy – alto saxophone, flute, bass clarinet
 Jaki Byard – piano
 Charles Mingus – bass, narration ("Freedom")
 Walter Perkins – drums
 Bob Hammer – arranger and orchestrator

Tracks #2 and 3, recorded on January 20, 1963:

 Rolf Ericson – trumpet
 Richard Williams – trumpet
 Quentin Jackson – trombone
 Don Butterfield – tuba
 Jerome Richardson – soprano and baritone saxophone, flute
 Dick Hafer – tenor saxophone, flute, oboe
 Charlie Mariano – alto saxophone
 Jaki Byard – piano
 Jay Berliner – guitar
 Charles Mingus – bass, piano
 Dannie Richmond – drums
 Bob Hammer – arranger and orchestrator

Production
 Bob Thiele – producer
 Michael Cuscuna – reissue Producer
 Bob Simpson – engineer
 Erick Labson – remastering

References 

1964 albums
Charles Mingus albums
Impulse! Records albums
Albums produced by Bob Thiele